Vladimir Konstantinovich Safronov (29 December 1934 in Ulan-Ude, Buryat-Mongol ASSR — 26 December 1979) was a featherweight amateur boxer.

Safronov trained at the Armed Forces sports society in Chita, Irkutsk, Moscow. He became the Honoured Master of Sports of the USSR in 1957 and was awarded the Order of the Badge of Honor in the same year. He became the first boxer of the USSR to win a gold medal at Olympics. He won gold in Boxing at the 1956 Summer Olympics in Melbourne in the featherweight division (– 57 kg). During his career Safronov won 564 fights out of 565.

Safronov graduated from Moscow Poligraphy Institute in 1963 and worked as an art editor at Fizkultura i sport publisher.

1956 Olympic results 
Below is the record of Vladimir Safronov, a featherweight boxer from the Soviet Union who competed at the 1956 Olympic Games in Melbourne:

Round of 32: bye
Round of 16: Defeated Agostino Cossia (Italy) points
Quarterfinal: Defeated Andre de Souza (France) points
Semifinal: Defeated Henryk Niedzwiedzki (Poland) points
Final: Defeated Thomas Nicholls (Great Britain) points (Won gold medal)

References

External links
Olympic profile

1934 births
1979 deaths
Soviet male boxers
Olympic boxers of the Soviet Union
Honoured Masters of Sport of the USSR
Featherweight boxers
Olympic gold medalists for the Soviet Union
Boxers at the 1956 Summer Olympics
Olympic medalists in boxing
People from Ulan-Ude
Russian male boxers
Medalists at the 1956 Summer Olympics
Sportspeople from Buryatia